Gyula Bezerédi (1858–1925) was a prolific Hungarian sculptor, best remembered in the United States for his 1906 statue of George Washington in Budapest.

External links

  His works on google

1858 births
1925 deaths
20th-century Hungarian sculptors
19th-century Hungarian sculptors